Estonian Centre for Contemporary Art (abbreviation CCA) is a non-profit expert institution, which via international projects activates and develops Estonian contemporary art scene. CCA office is located in Tallinn. It accommodates an archive of cultural and art historical significance. CCA has been mediating information about the work of local artists since 1992 when CCA was founded.

Since 2013, CCA director is Maria Arusoo.

Commissioner of the Estonian pavilion 
CCA is the commissioner of the Estonian pavilion at the Venice Biennale.

Archive of contemporary art 
CCA has been mediating information about the work of local artists since 1992. In 2020 it launched an online database of significant contemporary artists in Estonia.

References

External links
 

Estonian art